Elena Meuti (Rome, 26 June 1983) is a female Italian athlete, specializes in the high jump, her personal best of 1.92 m, which is the 6th Italian best performance of all-time.

Biography
The best career result at the international level, it was the 12th place at the 2006 European Championships in Athletics, when in order to qualify to the final, twice had to improve their staff, bringing it to 1.92 m.

The September 22, 2012 is found a positive antidoping (cannabis), after his performance in the final gold A (championship ever on the track), which was held in Modena. In the analyzed sample is found to contain THC Metabolite> DL.

Achievements

See also
Female two metres club
Italian all-time top lists - High jump

References

External links
 

1983 births
Living people
Athletes from Rome
Italian female high jumpers